William Edmundson  or Edmondson (1627—1712) was the founder of Quakerism in Ireland.

Early life
Edmundson was born in Little Musgrave, Westmorland, England in 1627. His parents died when he was young, and so he was raised by an uncle. He was apprenticed as a carpenter at York, and after completion, he joined the Parliamentary Army during the English Civil War. He went to Scotland in 1650. He also took part in the Battle of Worcester. While serving in the military, he was first introduced to Quakerism while stationed at Chesterfield. He was discharged and eventually went to live in County Antrim, Ireland.

Quakerism
He established the first Meeting House in Lurgan, Ireland in 1654. He was imprisoned several times, but was released thereafter.

After this first establishment, Edmundson spent the rest of his life building the Society of Friends in Ireland. He lived most of his life in the once Quaker village of Rosenallis, Co Laois (aka County Leix, aka Queen's County), where he had a residence at Tineal House.  Edmundson also visited America and debated the Protestant theologian Roger Williams in Rhode Island (New England) in 1672 with several other Quakers, and Williams was particularly offended by Edmundson's perceived rudeness. The debate was published in Williams' George Fox Digged out of his Burrowes.  Edmundson's life as a Quaker is documented in his journal titled "A Journal of the Life, Travels, Sufferings, and Labour of Love of William Edmundson".

Family

He married firstly in 1652 Margaret Staniforth or Stanford who died in 1689 and secondly Mary Strangman who survived him. He had nine children, Thomas, 
Mary, William, Samuel, Hindrance, Susanna, Anna, Tryal. He obviously did not approve of some of them as his will refers to My unhappy son William, my unruly son Samuel, my foolish and disobedient daughter Hindrance, my rebellious daughter Anne.

See also
List of abolitionist forerunners

Bibliography
Bibliography

References

External links
Notable Quakers - Quakers in Ireland
Genealogy of William Edmondson

1627 births
1712 deaths
People from Westmorland
Converts to Quakerism
English Quakers
17th-century Irish people
Irish Quakers
17th-century Quakers
17th-century Protestants
Roundheads